The ambassador of Sweden to Ukraine is in charge of Sweden's diplomatic mission to Ukraine.

Swedish ambassadors and consuls to Ukraine from 1992

The Swedish embassy in Kyiv was opened in 1992 with its location at Hotel National on vul. Rozi Luksemburg 5. Since 1997 the embassy is located at vul. Ivana Franka 34/33.

Since 2000 there is also a Swedish honorary consulate in Kakhovka, Kherson Oblast in southern Ukraine.

Swedish representatives in the Ukrainian part of the Russian Empire

Sweden also had several consuls and vice-consuls in the Ukrainian part of the Russian Empire. The diplomatic representations were formally in function until 1924, but in reality until about 1920. There were consuls in Odessa, Kharkov and Kyiv and vice-consuls (most often non-Swedes) in Berdyansk, Kerch, Mariupol, Nikolayev, Odessa, Sevastopol and Taganrog.

See also 
 Embassy of Sweden in Kyiv
 Diplomatic missions of Sweden
 Swedish-Ukrainian relations

Notes

References 
 Sveriges Statskalender 1835–2008
The official website of the Swedish Embassy in Kyiv

Ukraine
List
Sweden